Rajya Sabha elections were held on various dates in 1985, to elect members of the Rajya Sabha, Indian Parliament's upper chamber.

Elections
Elections were held to elect members from various states.

Members elected
The following members are elected in the elections held in 1985. They are members for the term 1985–1991 and retire in year 1991, except in case of the resignation or death before the term.
The list is incomplete.

State - Member - Party

Bye-elections
The following bye elections were held in the year 1985.

State - Member - Party

 Nominated -- H L Kapur -- INC ( ele  03/01/1985 term till 1988 ) res 14/11/1985
 Uttar Pradesh -- Kamlapati Tripathi -- INC ( ele  19/01/1985 term till 1986 )
 Uttar Pradesh -- Anand Prakash Gautam -- INC ( ele  28/01/1985 term till 1986 )
 Uttar Pradesh -- Kapil Verma -- INC ( ele  28/01/1985 term till 1986 )
 Uttar Pradesh -- Achchey Lal Balmik -- INC ( ele  28/01/1985 term till 1986 )
 Uttar Pradesh -- Dr Faguni Ram  -- INC ( ele  28/01/1985 term till 1988 )
 Uttar Pradesh --Sushila Rohtagi  -- INC ( ele  28/01/1985 term till 1988 )
 Uttar Pradesh -- Smt Kailashpati -- INC ( ele  11/02/1985 term till 1988 )
 West Bengal - Dr R K Poddar - CPM ( ele  12/03/1985 term till 1987 )
 West Bengal - Gurudas Dasgupta - CPM ( ele  12/03/1985 term till 1988 )
 Uttar Pradesh - Makhan Lal Fotedar - INC ( ele 09/05/1985 term till 1990 )
 Gujarat -  P Shiv Shankar - INC ( ele  10/05/1985 term till 1987 )
 Maharashtra - Pratibha Devisingh Patil - INC ( ele  05/07/1985 term till 1990 )
 Maharashtra - Maruti Mane Patil - INC ( ele  05/07/1985 term till 1986 )
 Rajashthan - B L Panwar - INC ( ele  02/07/1985 term till 1986 )
 Rajashthan - Dr H P Sharma- INC ( ele  02/07/1985 term till 1988 )
 Nominated - Salim Ali - NOM ( ele  4/09/1985 term till 1988 ) dea 20/06/1987
 Uttar Pradesh - Narayan Dutt Tiwari - INC ( ele 02/12/1985 term till 1986 )
 West Bengal - Chitta Basu - CPM ( ele 02/12/1985 term till 1990 ) 27/11/1989

References

1985 elections in India
1985